George Richard Lycott Bovell (born 18 July 1983) is an Olympic bronze medalist swimmer and former world record holder from Trinidad and Tobago. Bovell is also a two-time World Championship bronze medalist.

Olympic career
George Bovell represented Trinidad and Tobago at the 2000, 2004, 2008, 2012, and 2016 Olympics. At the 2004 Olympics, he won a bronze medal in the men's 200 IM: the 9th medalist in the country's history and 12th medal overall. It was also the first-ever Olympic swimming medal for the country, and T&T's only medal from the 2004 Olympics. Bovell made it to the Finals of the 50 meter Freestyle in London where he placed 7th after returning from a forced hiatus due to a brain injury earlier in the season. Bovell carried the T&T flag at the opening ceremony of the Beijing Olympics in 2008, the 20th Central American and Caribbean Games in Cartagena, Colombia and in the closing ceremonies of the 2000, 2004 and 2012 Olympic Games.

World Championships 

In 2013 Bovell won the bronze medal in the 50m freestyle at the FINA World Long Course Championships in Barcelona. His Bronze Medal time of 21.51 seconds would have won the silver in the London Olympic Final a year earlier.

In 2012 Bovell won the bronze medal in the 100m Individual Medley at the Fina World Short Course Championships in Istanbul.

Bovell has been in 10 World Championship finals since 2001.

Swimming Career Highlights

Olympic Bronze Medallist
Former World Record Holder
Two-time World Championship Bronze Medallist
Six-time Pan Am Games Medallist (2 Gold, 2 Silver, 2 Bronze)
Ten-time World Championship Finalist
2nd Place Overall in the 2012 FINA World Cup (7 gold, 9 silver)
Five-time Individual NCAA Champion
Eight-time Individual SEC Champion
Caribbean and Central American Champion of three consecutive games and record holder, also 3 silvers, 2 bronzes
Former NCAA Record Holder
Most All American Honours in Auburn History with 25
Multiple Caribbean and Central American record holder
Four-time NCAA Team Champion
Undefeated in NCAA team Division 1 swimming career

Trinidad and Tobago National Awards

Chaconia Gold
Humming Bird Gold
Trinidad and Tobago Sportsman of the Year 2004 & 2014
TTOC Athlete of the year
2012 CCN TV6 Viewers Choice Sports Personality of the Year
2013 Trinidad Express Personality of the Year
2014 CCN TV6 Viewers Choice Sports Personality of the Year
2014 Trinidad Guardian Sportsman of the Year
2014 Trinidad Tobago Olympic Committee Sports Personality of the Year

Main Events

Best Times

50m LCM freestyle (suit) 21.20
50m LCM freestyle (textile) 21.51
100m LCM freestyle 48.82
200m Freestyle LCM 1.48.80
200m LCM Individual Medley 1.58.80
50m freestyle SCM 20.82
100m freestyle SCM 47.03
100m Individual Medley 51.15

References

External links
 
 
 
 
 
 
 
 

1983 births
Living people
Trinidad and Tobago male swimmers
Male medley swimmers
Auburn Tigers men's swimmers
World Aquatics Championships medalists in swimming
World record setters in swimming
Medalists at the FINA World Swimming Championships (25 m)
Olympic swimmers of Trinidad and Tobago
Olympic bronze medalists for Trinidad and Tobago
Olympic bronze medalists in swimming
Swimmers at the 2000 Summer Olympics
Swimmers at the 2004 Summer Olympics
Swimmers at the 2008 Summer Olympics
Swimmers at the 2012 Summer Olympics
Swimmers at the 2016 Summer Olympics
Medalists at the 2004 Summer Olympics
Commonwealth Games competitors for Trinidad and Tobago
Swimmers at the 2014 Commonwealth Games
Pan American Games medalists in swimming
Pan American Games gold medalists for Trinidad and Tobago
Pan American Games silver medalists for Trinidad and Tobago
Pan American Games bronze medalists for Trinidad and Tobago
Swimmers at the 2003 Pan American Games
Swimmers at the 2007 Pan American Games
Swimmers at the 2015 Pan American Games
Medalists at the 2003 Pan American Games
Medalists at the 2007 Pan American Games
Medalists at the 2015 Pan American Games
Central American and Caribbean Games medalists in swimming
Central American and Caribbean Games gold medalists for Trinidad and Tobago
Central American and Caribbean Games silver medalists for Trinidad and Tobago
Central American and Caribbean Games bronze medalists for Trinidad and Tobago
Competitors at the 2006 Central American and Caribbean Games
Competitors at the 2010 Central American and Caribbean Games
Competitors at the 2014 Central American and Caribbean Games
Trinidad and Tobago people of European descent
Recipients of the Chaconia Medal
Bolles School alumni
Sportspeople from Port of Spain
Sportspeople from Guelph